= Henry Hubert =

Canadian football player

Profile
- Position: Guard

Personal information
- Born: 1946 (age 79–80); Alberta, Canada
- Listed height: 6 ft 3 in (1.91 m)
- Listed weight: 240 lb (109 kg)

Career information
- High school: Eastglen
- College: Southern Oklahoma State

Career history
- 1968–1971: Edmonton Eskimos

Henry Hubert (born 1946) is a Canadian football player who played for the Edmonton Eskimos.
